Maine Media College, formerly Rockport College, is a small school located in Rockport, Maine. It was founded as an adjunct to the Maine Media Workshops.

History
Maine Media College began in 1980 as a partnership between The Maine Photographic Workshops and University of Maine at Augusta. In 1996, the college was officially founded under the name "Rockport College" and was granted the authority to confer Associates of Arts and Masters of Fine Arts degrees, as well as Professional Certificates in photography, film, multi-media. In 2009, Maine Media College announced the inaugural year of a Multimedia Professional Certificate Program.  The school is currently undergoing an accreditation process for its MFA Program.

In August 2008 Rockport College officially changed its name to Maine Media College, to emphasize its close relationship with the Maine Media Workshops.

Campus
The Homestead, an 1809 farmhouse includes accommodations, classrooms and the kitchen.

At the heart of the campus, the Haas Center houses the offices for the admissions, administration, and business departments, classrooms and student darkrooms that offer eight private darkrooms, a 16-enlarger gang darkroom, and the B&W Lab.

The Post-Production facility offers Macintosh editing stations with Apple Final Cut Pro as well as Avid Xpress Pro in addition to providing classroom space, and private editing suites.

The Sound Stage is a  studio, complete with 400 amps of power, lights, sets and grip equipment for film, video and photo productions.

The Film and Video Technical Department contains camera, sound, lighting and grip equipment.

Directly across the street from the Homestead, the Campus Residence features classrooms, internet café, student accommodations and laundry facilities.

Housing
Student Residences are located throughout Rockport - and include dorms, student rooms in campus homes. Students may choose to reside off-campus. There are accommodations on-campus for around 100 students in a combination of singles or doubles.

See also
 Maine Media Workshops

References

External links

Universities and colleges in Knox County, Maine
Art schools in Maine
1996 establishments in Maine
Educational institutions established in 1996
Private universities and colleges in Maine